John Roche (1848–27 August 1914) was an Irish politician.

Born in Woodford, County Galway, he was the son of William Roche, a miller and farmer.

He was a tenant on the Woodford estate of the Earl of Clanricarde, and was jailed on a number of occasions for his active opposition to eviction proceedings during the Land War.

He married, in 1878, Teresa Donnelly, of Douras, Co. Galway.

He was MP for Galway East from 14 May 1890 to his death in 1914.

He was a member of the Anti-Parnellite Irish National Federation during the split in the Irish Parliamentary Party.

References

External links

1848 births
1914 deaths
Members of the Parliament of the United Kingdom for County Galway constituencies (1801–1922)
Anti-Parnellite MPs
Irish Parliamentary Party MPs
UK MPs 1886–1892
UK MPs 1892–1895
UK MPs 1895–1900
UK MPs 1900–1906
UK MPs 1906–1910
UK MPs 1910
UK MPs 1910–1918
Politicians from County Galway